Matsuko is a feminine Japanese given name. Notable people with the name include:

Matsuko Deluxe (born 1972), Japanese columnist, essayist and TV personality
, Japanese singer-songwriter
, Japanese lover of Katsura Kogorō

See also
Memories of Matsuko, a 2006 Japanese film

Japanese feminine given names